Ocotea staminoides is a species of evergreen tree in the plant genus Ocotea of the family Lauraceae. It is endemic to Jamaica.

References

staminoides
Endemic flora of Jamaica
Trees of Jamaica
Endangered flora of North America
Taxonomy articles created by Polbot